Leventhorpe may refer to:

Collett Leventhorpe (1815–1889), US brigadier-general
John Leventhorpe (c.1370–1435), royal attorney
Leventhorpe baronets
The Leventhorpe School